Chelse Elizabeth Ashley Swain (born May 25, 1983) is an American actress, best known for playing Bonnie Lisbon in the 1999 American film The Virgin Suicides. Her sister is the actress Dominique Swain.

Filmography

External links

1983 births
Actresses from Los Angeles
American film actresses
Living people
21st-century American women